The Board of Ordnance in the Kingdom of Ireland (1542–1800) performed the equivalent duties of the British Board of Ordnance: supplying arms and munitions, overseeing the Royal Irish Artillery and the Irish Engineers, and maintaining the fortifications in the island.

Following the Acts of Union 1800, the Board was abolished and the duties taken over by the United Kingdom Board of Ordnance. The various officials of the Board were compensated with pensions for their loss of salary and emoluments.

Officials of the Board of Ordnance
lists are incomplete before 1760

Master-General of the Ordnance

Salary in 1800: £1,500
 In 1539: Sir John Travers
 1559–1587: Edward Maria Wingfield
 1588: Sir George Carew
 1592: Sir George Bourchier
 1605: Oliver St John, 1st Viscount Grandison
 1614: ...
 1617: Toby Caulfeild, 1st Baron Caulfeild
 1627: William Caulfeild, 2nd Baron Caulfeild
 1634: Sir John Borlase (jointly with Sir Thomas Lucas)
 1648: Roger Boyle, 1st Baron Broghill
 ...
 1660: Hugh Montgomery, 1st Earl of Mount Alexander
 1663: Sir Robert Byron
 1674: Sir Thomas Chicheley (also Master-General of the Ordnance in England)
 1679: Francis Aungier, 1st Earl of Longford
 1684: William Stewart, 1st Viscount Mountjoy
 1692: William Wolseley
 1698: Hugh Montgomery, 2nd Earl of Mount Alexander
 1705: Richard Ingoldsby
 1712: Charles Butler, 1st Earl of Arran
 1714: William Stewart, 2nd Viscount Mountjoy
 1727: François de La Rochefoucauld, marquis de Montandre
 1739: Richard Molesworth, 3rd Viscount Molesworth
 1758: James FitzGerald, 1st Duke of Leinster
 1766: Richard Boyle, 2nd Earl of Shannon
 1770: Charles Moore, 1st Marquess of Drogheda
 1797: Henry Lawes Luttrell, 2nd Earl of Carhampton
 1800: Thomas Pakenham
Pakenham was granted compensation of £1,200 per annum after the Union.

Lieutenant-General of the Ordnance
Salary in 1800: £600
 1660: Sir Albert Conyngham
 1687: John Giles
 1689: William Mansel Barker (Jacobite)
 1692: Francis Cuffe
 1695: Chidley Coote
 1698: Jermyn Wych
 1702: Chidley Coote
 1706: Thomas Burgh
 1714: Richard Molesworth
 bef 1738: Edward Hill
 ...
 1759: Bernard Hale
 1789: Henry Lawes Luttrell, 2nd Earl of Carhampton
 1797: Thomas Pakenham
 1800: Marcus Beresford
Beresford was granted compensation of £600 per annum after the Union.

Surveyor-General of the Ordnance
Salary in 1800: £450
 in 1704: George Houghton
 in 1738: Peter Virasell
 by 1760: Ralph Ward
 1789: Thomas Pakenham
 1797: Sir George Shee, 1st Baronet
 1799: Robert Uniacke
Uniacke was granted compensation of £1,206 13s. per annum after the Union.

Clerk of the Ordnance
Salary in 1800: £300
 1691–aft. 1705: Edward Payne
...
 bef. 1722–aft. 1738: Hector Pain
 by 1760: Joseph Keene
 1788: Isaac Corry
 1789:  Richard Magenis
 1800: Ponsonby Tottenham
Tottenham was granted compensation of £487 2s. 6d. per annum after the Union.

Principal Storekeeper
Salary in 1800: £200
 1691: Hugh Rowley
 in 1738: John Favier
 1748: Thomas Coote
 1768: John Creighton
 1775: Thomas Coghlan
 1788: Thomas Pakenham
 1789: Thomas Loftus
 1792: Richard Archdall
 1797: Charles Handfield
 1798: Henry Alexander
 1799: John Hobson
Hobson was granted compensation of £616 13s. 9d. per annum after the Union.

Clerk of the Deliveries
Salary in 1800: £200
 by 1760: John Gustavus Handcock
 1767: John Magill
 1775: Robert Tighe
 1789: Edward King
 1789: Robert Wynne
Wynne was granted compensation of £400 per annum after the Union.

Treasurer
Salary in 1800: £200
 by 1760: John Chaigneau
 1779: Thomas Burgh
Burgh was granted compensation of £500 per annum after the Union.

Secretary to the Master-General
Salary in 1800: £182 10s.
 by 1760: Peter Bere
 1766: Robert Pratt
 1770: Henry Meredyth
 1789: John Armit
 1800: Joseph Atkinson
Atkinson was granted compensation of £520 3s. 6d. per annum after the Union.

References
 Robert Beatson, A political index to the histories of Great Britain and Ireland, volume III (London, 1806)

Military history of Ireland
1801 disestablishments in Ireland